Elson Moyo is a Zimbabwean air officer and military general who serves as commander of the Air Force of Zimbabwe since December 2017 and one of the main figures in the 2017 Zimbabwean coup d'état attempt. He was previously deputy commander of the air force. At the time he was appointed air force commander, Moyo's military rank was upgraded from air vice-marshal to air marshal by President Emmerson Mnangagwa. In 2003 he was promoted from air commodore to air vice-marshal by former president Robert Mugabe.

Early life and education

Moyo was born in Mberengwa.  In 1977, when he was a student at Manama Secondary School, Moyo together with his cousin SB Moyo left school and joined the liberation struggle via Botswana.

Career

Moyo was one of the first blacks to receive full training as a pilot together with retired Air Marshal Shebba Shumbayaonda.  However, the two had to be trained outside the country because the Rhodesian government worked to block black Africans from becoming pilots.

After Zimbabwe gained independence, Moyo was a flying instructor at Thornhill Airbase in Gweru.  During this time he trained many pilots who went on to become senior officers in the AFZ.  Moyo was promoted from air commodore to air vice-marshal in November 2003.  In early 2007, he held the post of Chief of Staff - Operations.  Unlike former Air Force Commander, Perrance Shiri and the other high-ranking AFZ officers, Moyo is able to fly an aircraft and as such he commanded a degree of personal loyalty from those senior officers whom he instructed during their flying training.

Moyo is an accomplished pilot, who in 2011, had 1970 hours flying time in the following aircraft: Hunter, SF260M, SF260TP, Hawk, MIG 15, L29, MF1-17 and T-37.

Death escape 
Following what were reported as clashes with Shiri, in March 2007 Moyo had become critically ill as a result of suspected poisoning.  He later recovered.

Controversy 
Moyo was arrested on 7 June 2007 along with Major General Engelbert Rugeje and around 400 other military personnel for allegedly plotting to overthrow the Mugabe administration.  It was later noted that Moyo was under 24-hour surveillance and had been removed from his public roles. In 2015, Moyo was still in military service and reported to be the Chief of Staff for Joint Operation and Plans.

Elson Moyo achieved some notoriety after he was sued for allegedly committing adultery with the wife of a policeman.

References

Air Force of Zimbabwe air marshals
Living people
Place of birth missing (living people)
Year of birth missing (living people)